The Amundsen Basin, with depths up to , is the deepest abyssal plain in the Arctic Ocean, and contains the geographic North Pole. It is named after the polar researcher Roald Amundsen. Together with the Nansen Basin, the Amundsen Basin is often summarized as Eurasian Basin.

The Russian-American cooperation Nansen and Amundsen Basin Observational System (NABOS) aims "to provide a quantitative observationally based assessment of circulation, water mass transformations, and transformation mechanisms in the Eurasian and Canadian Basins of the Arctic Ocean".

Formation 
The Amundsen Basin formed during the Cenozoic Era from seafloor spreading.

See also

Wilkes Basin

References 

Abyssal plains
Oceanic basins of the Arctic Ocean